The  Washington Redskins season was the franchise's 80th season in the National Football League (NFL) and their 75th representing the District of Columbia (Washington, D.C.). Their home games were played at FedExField in Landover, Maryland for the 15th consecutive year. Washington played in the Eastern division of the National Football Conference (NFC). The Redskins failed to improve on their 2010 record of 6–10, but did manage to defeat the New York Giants, the eventual Super Bowl champions, twice in the regular season, becoming only the sixth team to do so (the 1969 Oakland Raiders, 1983 Seattle Seahawks, 1995 Washington Redskins, 2002 New Orleans Saints, and 2007 Dallas Cowboys, also against the Giants, being the others).

Offseason

2011 NFL Draft

The Redskins finished the 2010 season with a record of 6–10 and will be picking 6th overall.

Transactions involving 2011 draft picks
The Redskins traded their first-round selection (#10 overall) to the Jacksonville Jaguars for its first-round selection (#16 overall) and a second-round selection (#49 overall).
The Redskins traded their third-round selection (#72 overall) and a 2012 conditional sixth-round selection to the New Orleans Saints in exchange for T Jammal Brown and a fifth-round selection (#155 overall).
The Redskins traded their fourth-round selection (#104 overall) and a 2010 second-round selection to the Philadelphia Eagles in exchange for QB Donovan McNabb.
The Redskins acquired a seventh-round selection in a trade that sent CB Justin Tryon to the Indianapolis Colts.
The Redskins received a seventh-round compensatory pick.

Staff

Final roster

Preseason

Schedule

The Redskins' preseason schedule was announced on April 12, 2011. It was finalized on April 19, 2011.

Regular season

Schedule

LEGEND:
 Royal blue indicates that the Redskins were the visiting team in the Bills Toronto Series.

Game summaries

Week 1: vs. New York Giants

The Redskins opened the 2011 season at home against their division rival the New York Giants, to mark the tenth anniversary of September 11, 2001; both teams represented the cities that were targeted by the terrorists that day.

With the win, the Redskins started their season at 1–0.

Week 2: vs. Arizona Cardinals

With the win, the Redskins improved to 2–0. This would be the last time the team would win a game at home until hosting the Minnesota Vikings during the middle of the 2012 season.

Week 3: at Dallas Cowboys

Coming off their home win over the Cardinals, the Redskins flew to Cowboys Stadium for a Week 3 NFC East duel with the Dallas Cowboys on Monday night.  Washington threw the game's opening punch in the first quarter with a 46-yard field goal from kicker Graham Gano.  The Cowboys answered with kicker Dan Bailey getting a 41-yard field goal, while the Redskins replied with Gano's 27-yard field goal.  Dallas would take the lead in the second quarter as Bailey made a 27-yard and a 32-yard field goal, yet the Redskins closed out the half with Gano's 50-yard field goal.

Washington began the third quarter with quarterback Rex Grossman finding running back Tim Hightower on a 1-yard touchdown pass.  The Cowboys would end the third quarter with Bailey making a 41-yard field goal.  Dallas regained the lead in the fourth quarter with Bailey booting a 23-yard and a 40-yard field goal.  The 'Skins tried to rally, but the Cowboys' defense held on to preserve the win.

With the loss, the Redskins fell to 2–1.

Week 4: at St. Louis Rams

With the win, the Redskins went into their bye week at 3–1.

Week 6: vs. Philadelphia Eagles

With the loss, the Redskins fell to 3–2.

Week 7: at Carolina Panthers

With the loss, the Redskins fell to 3–3.

Week 8: at Buffalo Bills
Bills Toronto Series

With the loss, the Redskins fell to 3–4.

Week 9: vs. San Francisco 49ers

Although the Redskins lost and fell to 3–5, it was during this game that kicker Graham Gano made a 59-yard field goal, which set an all time Washington Redskin franchise record.

Week 10: at Miami Dolphins

With the loss, the Redskins fell to 3–6.

Week 11: vs. Dallas Cowboys

With the loss, the Redskins fell to 3–7.

Week 12: at Seattle Seahawks

With the win, the Redskins improved to 4–7 and snapped their 6-game losing streak.

Week 13: vs. New York Jets

With the loss, the Redskins fell to 4–8.

Week 14: vs. New England Patriots

With the loss, the Redskins fell to 4–9 and were officially eliminated from playoff contention.

Week 15: at New York Giants

With the win, the Redskins improved to 5–9 and swept the Giants for the first time since 1999.

Week 16: vs. Minnesota Vikings

With the loss, the Redskins fell to 5–10.

Week 17: at Philadelphia Eagles

With the loss, the Redskins finished the season 5–11.

Standings

References

External links
Official Website

Washington
Washington Redskins seasons
Red